This list contains an overview of the railway companies in Germany and German colonies that no longer exist. These include railway units that have no independent legal status.

For railway companies in existence today, see the List of German railway companies.

For the chronological order in which the first railways appeared in Germany see the List of the first German railways to 1870.

State railways

State railways (Länderbahnen) in the German Empire (to 1918/1919) 
 Prussian state railways (Preußische Staatseisenbahnen) (from 1896 United Prussian and Hessian State Railways (Vereinigte Preußische und Hessische Staatseisenbahnen)
 Royal Bavarian State Railways (Königlich Bayerische Staats-Eisenbahnen or K.Bay.Sts.B.)
 Ludwig South-North Railway (Ludwig-Süd-Nord-Bahn)
 Ludwig's Western Railway (Ludwigs-West-Bahn)
 Bavarian Maximilian Railway (Bayerische Maximiliansbahn)
 Royal Saxon State Railways (Königlich Sächsische Staatseisenbahnen or K.Sächs.Sts.E.B.)
 Royal Württemberg State Railways (Königlich Württembergische Staats-Eisenbahnen or K.W.St.E.)
 Baden State Railways (Badische Staatseisenbahnen, 1840–1920)
 Grand Duchy of Hesse State Railways (Großherzoglich Hessische Staatseisenbahnen, from 1896 the United Prussian and Hessian State Railways (Vereinigte Preußische und Hessische Staatseisenbahnen)
 Grand Duchy of Mecklenburg Friedrich-Franz Railway (Großherzoglich Mecklenburgische Friedrich-Franz-Eisenbahn or MFFE)
 Grand Duchy of Oldenburg State Railways (Großherzoglich Oldenburgische Staatseisenbahnen or G.O.E., 1867–1920)
 Bremen State Railway (Bremer Staatsbahn, private railway in Prussia owned by the Free Hanseatic City of Bremen, hence listed twice)
 Imperial Railways in Alsace-Lorraine (Reichseisenbahnen in Elsaß-Lothringen)

Other state railways before the founding of the Reich in 1871 
 Royal Hanoverian State Railways (Königlich Hannöversche Staatseisenbahnen, to 1866)
 Duchy of Brunswick State Railway (Herzoglich Braunschweigische Staatseisenbahn, to 1870)
 Nassau State Railway (Nassauische Staatsbahn, to 1866)
 Anhalt Leopold Railway (Anhaltische Leopoldsbahn, to 1871)
 Bebra–Hanau Railway (Bebra-Hanauer Eisenbahn, Kurhessian state railway, to 1866)
 Frankfurt–Bebra railway (Frankfurt-Bebraer Eisenbahn)
 Frankfurt–Offenbach Railway (Frankfurt-Offenbacher Eisenbahn)
 Royal Westphalian Railway Company (Königlich-Westfälische Eisenbahn-Gesellschaft)
 Main–Weser Railway (Main-Weser-Bahn)
 Main-Neckar Railway (Main-Neckar-Eisenbahn)
 Prussian Northern Railway (Preußische Nordbahn)
 Prussian Eastern Railway (Preußische Ostbahn)
 Saarbrücken Railway (Saarbrücker Eisenbahn)

State railways after 1920 
 Deutsche Reichsbahn (1920 to 1949), from 1924 to 1937 Deutsche Reichsbahn-Gesellschaft
 Southwest German Railways (Betriebsvereinigung der Südwestdeutschen Eisenbahnen) (SWDE)
 Railways of the Saarland (Eisenbahnen des Saarlandes) (EdS)
 Deutsche Reichsbahn in the GDR (DR, 1949 to 1993)
 Deutsche Bundesbahn (DB, 1949 to 1993)

Private railway companies

A–C 

 Aachen-Neuß-Düsseldorfer Eisenbahn-Gesellschaft
 Aachener Industriebahn
 Bavarian Eastern Railway Company (AG der Bayerischen Ostbahnen)
 AG für Bahn-Bau und -Betrieb
 AG Lokalbahn Lam-Kötzting
 AG für Verkehrswesen
 Ahaus-Enscheder Eisenbahn AG
 Albertsbahn AG (Dresden-Tharandt)
 Allgemeine Deutsche Eisenbahn-Betriebs-GmbH (ADEG)
 Allgemeine Deutsche Kleinbahn-Gesellschaft AG (ADKA)
 Altdamm-Colberger Eisenbahn-Gesellschaft
 Altenburg-Zeitzer Eisenbahngesellschaft
 Altona-Kieler Eisenbahn-Gesellschaft
 Angeln Bahn GmbH
 Arnstadt-Ichtershausener Eisenbahn
 Badische Lokal-Eisenbahnen AG
 Bergisch-Märkische Eisenbahn-Gesellschaft
 Berlin-Anhaltische Eisenbahn-Gesellschaft
 Berlin-Dresdener Eisenbahn-Gesellschaft
 Berlin-Frankfurter Eisenbahn-Gesellschaft
 Berlin-Görlitzer Eisenbahn-Gesellschaft
 Berlin-Hamburger Eisenbahn-Gesellschaft
 Berlin-Stettiner Eisenbahn-Gesellschaft
 Birkenfelder Eisenbahn GmbH
 Bonn-Cölner Eisenbahn-Gesellschaft
 Brandenburgische Städtebahn AG
 Braunschweig-Schöninger Eisenbahn AG
 Braunschweigische Landes-Eisenbahn-Gesellschaft
 Bremen State Railway (Bremer Staatsbahn, private railway in Prussia owned by the Free Hanseatic City of Bremen, hence shown twice)
 Breslau-Schweidnitz-Freiburger Eisenbahn-Gesellschaft
 Brölthaler Eisenbahn-Actien-Gesellschaft
 BVO Bahn GmbH
 Centralverwaltung für Secundairbahnen Herrmann Bachstein GmbH
 Hohenebra-Ebelebener Eisenbahn (siehe Bahnstrecke Hohenebra–Ebeleben)
 Greußen-Ebeleben-Keulaer Eisenbahn (siehe Bahnstrecke Hohenebra–Ebeleben)
 Chemnitz-Aue-Adorfer Eisenbahn-Gesellschaft
 Chemnitz-Komotauer Eisenbahn-Gesellschaft
 Chemnitz-Riesaer Eisenbahn-Gesellschaft
 Chemnitz-Würschnitzer Eisenbahngesellschaft
 ConTrain GmbH
 Cöln-Mindener Eisenbahn-Gesellschaft, siehe Köln-Mindener Eisenbahn-Gesellschaft
 Continentale Eisenbahn- Bau- und Betriebs- Gesellschaft
 Cottbus-Großenhainer Eisenbahn
 Crefeld-Kreis Kempener Industrie-Eisenbahn-Gesellschaft
 Cronberger Eisenbahn-Gesellschaft
 Cuxhavener Eisenbahn

D–F 

 Dahme-Uckroer Eisenbahn AG
 Dessau-Wörlitzer Eisenbahn-Gesellschaft
 Deutsche Eisenbahn-Betriebsgesellschaft AG (DEBG)
 Deutsche Eisenbahn-Gesellschaft AG (DEAG) (DEGA)
 Dortmund-Märkische Eisenbahn Gesellschaft
 Düsseldorf-Elberfelder Eisenbahn-Gesellschaft
 EBM Cargo GmbH & Co. KG
 Eckernförder Kreisbahnen (Eckernförde–Kappeln)
 Eisenbahn-Gesellschaft Darmstadt (Siehe)
 Eisenbahn-Gesellschaft Greifswald-Grimmen
 Eisenbahn-Gesellschaft Mühlhausen-Ebeleben
 Eisenbahn-Gesellschaft Stralsund-Tribsees
 Eisenbahn-Zweckverband Rastenberg-Hardisleben
 Eisern-Siegener Eisenbahn AG
 Elmshorn-Barmstedt-Oldesloer Eisenbahn AG
 Elztalbahn der Stadt Waldkirch
 Erzgebirgische Eisenbahngesellschaft
 Eutin-Lübecker Eisenbahn-Gesellschaft
 Filderbahn (Stuttgart und südliches Umland)
 Frankfurt-Hanauer Eisenbahn-Gesellschaft
 Freien Grunder Eisenbahn AG
 Friedrich-Wilhelms-Nordbahn-Gesellschaft

G–K 

 Gera-Meuselwitz-Wuitzer Eisenbahn AG
 Gernrode-Harzgeroder Eisenbahn-Gesellschaft
 Glasow-Berlinchener Eisenbahn-Gesellschaft
 Glückstadt-Elmshorner Eisenbahn-Gesellschaft, later Holsteinische- or Schleswig-Holsteinische Marschbahn-Gesellschaft
 Gößnitz-Geraer Eisenbahn-Gesellschaft
 Gotha-Ohrdrufer Eisenbahn-Gesellschaft
 Greiz–Brunner Eisenbahn-Gesellschaft
 Großenhainer Zweigbahn
 Güstrow-Plauer Eisenbahn-Gesellschaft (see Güstrow–Meyenburg railway)
 Hainichen-Rossweiner Eisenbahn-Gesellschaft 
 Halberstadt-Blankenburger Eisenbahn-Gesellschaft
 Halle-Sorau-Gubener Eisenbahn-Gesellschaft
 Hamburg-Bergedorfer Eisenbahn later absorbed into Berlin-Hamburger Bahn
 Hannover-Altenbekener Eisenbahn-Gesellschaft
 Heisterbacher Talbahn-Gesellschaft
 Hessian Ludwig Railway Company (Hessische Ludwigs-Eisenbahn-Gesellschaft)
 Hessische Nordbahn
 Hildesheim-Peiner Kreis-Eisenbahn-Gesellschaft
 Hochstadt-Stockheimer Eisenbahn
 Hof-Egerer Eisenbahn
 Hohenebra-Ebelebener Eisenbahn
 Homburger Eisenbahn-Gesellschaft
 Hoyaer Eisenbahn-Gesellschaft
 Jever-Carolinensieler Eisenbahn
 Karsdorfer Eisenbahngesellschaft GmbH (KEG)
 Kerkerbachbahn AG (German language article)
 Kiel-Eckernförde-Flensburger Eisenbahn-Gesellschaft
 Kirchheimer Eisenbahn-Gesellschaft
 Köln-Bonner Eisenbahnen AG
 Köln-Krefelder Eisenbahn-Gesellschaft
 Köln-Mindener Eisenbahn-Gesellschaft
 Königsberg-Cranzer Eisenbahngesellschaft
 Krefelder Eisenbahn-Gesellschaft AG
 Kreis Altenaer Eisenbahn AG
 Kreis Oldenburger Eisenbahn AG
 Kreisbahn Eckernförde-Kappeln
 Kurfürst-Friedrich-Wilhelms-Nordbahn-Gesellschaft

L–N 

 Lahrer Eisenbahn-Gesellschaft
 Lahrer Straßenbahn-Gesellschaft
 Lausitzer Eisenbahn-Gesellschaft AG (im Besitz der LAG München)
 Leipzig-Dresdner Eisenbahn-Compagnie
 Lenz & Co GmbH
 Liegnitz-Rawitscher Eisenbahn-Gesellschaft AG
 Lloydbahn Neustrelitz-Warnemünde
 Löbau-Zittauer Eisenbahn-Gesellschaft
 Lokalbahn AG (LAG München) (also:Localbahn AG)
 Lokalbahn Lam-Kötzting AG (LLK)
 Lokalbahn Deggendorf-Metten
 Lübeck-Büchener Eisenbahn (LBE)
 Märkisch-Posener Eisenbahn-Gesellschaft
 Magdeburg-Halberstädter Eisenbahngesellschaft
 Magdeburg-Leipziger Eisenbahn-Gesellschaft
 Magdeburg-Wittenbergesche Eisenbahn-Gesellschaft
 Marienburg-Mlawkaer Eisenbahn-Gesellschaft
 Mecklenburgische Friedrich-Wilhelm-Eisenbahn-Gesellschaft
 Mecklenburgische Südbahn-Gesellschaft
 Mecklenburgische Eisenbahngesellschaft
 Mehltheuer-Weidaer Eisenbahn-Gesellschaft 
 Meppen-Haselünner Eisenbahn
 Mittelbadische Eisenbahnen AG
 Müllheim-Badenweiler Eisenbahn AG
 München-Augsburger Eisenbahn-Gesellschaft
 Münster-Enscheder Eisenbahn-Gesellschaft (see Münster–Gronau railway)
 Münster-Hammer Eisenbahn-Gesellschaft (see Münster–Hamm railway)
 Muldenthal-Eisenbahn-Gesellschaft
 Murgthal-Eisenbahn-Gesellschaft
 Nauendorf-Gerlebogker Eisenbahn-Gesellschaft
 Neubrandenburg-Friedländer Eisenbahn-Gesellschaft
 Neuhaldensleber Eisenbahn
 Neustadt-Dürkheimer Eisenbahn-Gesellschaft 
 Neustadt-Gogoliner Eisenbahn-Gesellschaft AG
 Neustrelitz-Warnemünder Eisenbahn (Lloyd-Bahn)
 Niederländisch-Westfälische Eisenbahn
 Niederlausitzer Eisenbahn-Gesellschaft
 Niedersächsisches Landeseisenbahnamt Hannover (NLEA)
 Niederschlesisch-Märkische Eisenbahn-Gesellschaft
 Nordbrabant-Deutsche Eisenbahn-Gesellschaft (Rotterdam)
 Nordhausen-Erfurter Eisenbahn-Gesellschaft
 Nordhausen-Wernigeroder Eisenbahn-Gesellschaft

O–S 

 Oberhessische Eisenbahn-Gesellschaft
 Oberlausitzer Eisenbahn-Gesellschaft
 Oberrheinische Eisenbahn-Gesellschaft
 Oschersleben-Schöninger Eisenbahn-Gesellschaft
 Ostdeutsche Eisenbahn-Gesellschaft in Königsberg
 Osterwieck-Wasserlebener Eisenbahn AG
 Ostpreußische Südbahn-Gesellschaft
 Parchim-Ludwigsluster Eisenbahn-Gesellschaft
 Paulinenaue-Neuruppiner Eisenbahn
 Peine-Ilseder Eisenbahn
 Palatinate Railway (Pfalzbahn)
 Palatine Ludwig Railway (Pfälzische Ludwigsbahn)
 Palatine Maximilian Railway (Pfälzische Maximiliansbahn)
 Palatine Northern Railway Company (Gesellschaft der Pfälzischen Nordbahnen)
 Neustadt–Dürkheim Railway Company (Neustadt-Dürkheimer Eisenbahn-Gesellschaft)
 Prignitzer Eisenbahn AG (1884–1940)
 Prinz-Wilhelm-Eisenbahn (Deilthaler Eisenbahn-Gesellschaft)
 Renchthal-Eisenbahn-Gesellschaft
 Rendsburg-Neumünstersche Eisenbahn-Gesellschaft
 Rhein-Nahe Eisenbahn-Gesellschaft
 Rhein-Sieg-Eisenbahn AG
 Rheinische Eisenbahn-Gesellschaft
 Rinteln-Stadthagener Eisenbahngesellschaft
 Ronsdorf-Müngstener Eisenbahn-Gesellschaft
 Ruhrort-Crefeld-Kreis Gladbacher Eisenbahn-Gesellschaft (see also Duisburg-Ruhrort–Mönchengladbach railway)
 Ruppiner Eisenbahn AG
 Saalbahn
 Saal-Unstrut-Eisenbahn-Gesellschaft
 Sächsisch-Bayerische Eisenbahn-Compagnie
 Sächsisch-Schlesische Eisenbahngesellschaft
 Sächsische Industriebahnen-Gesellschaft AG
 Sächsisch-Thüringische Eisenbahngesellschaft
 Schipkau-Finsterwalder Eisenbahn-Gesellschaft
 Schleswig-Holsteinische Marschbahngesellschaft
 Schleswig-Klosterkruger Eisenbahn
 Stahlbahnwerke Freudenstein
 Stargard-Cüstriner Eisenbahn-Gesellschaft
 Stargard-Posener Eisenbahn-Gesellschaft
 Stendal-Tangermünder Eisenbahn-Gesellschaft
 Südharz-Eisenbahn-Gesellschaft (Braunlage-Walkenried)
 South German Railway Company (Süddeutsche Eisenbahn-Gesellschaft) (SEG)

T–Z 

 Taunus-Eisenbahn-Gesellschaft
 Thurbo (in der Schweiz weiter aktiv)
 Teuringertal-Bahn GmbH
 Thüringische Eisenbahn-AG
 Esperstedt-Oldislebener Eisenbahn
 Greußen-Ebeleben-Keulaer Eisenbahn (see Hohenebra–Ebeleben railway)
 Ruhlaer Eisenbahn
 Weimar-Berka-Blankenhainer Eisenbahn
 Weimar-Buttelstedt-Großrudestedter Eisenbahn
 Weimar-Rastenberger Eisenbahn
 Uetersener Eisenbahn
 Unterelbesche Eisenbahngesellschaft
 Vering & Waechter
 Vorwohle-Emmerthaler Eisenbahn-Gesellschaft
 Wandsbeker Industriebahn
 Warstein-Lippstadter Eisenbahn-Gesellschaft
 Wenigentaft-Oechsener Eisenbahn E: H.Hagemeier GmbH
 Wermelskirchen-Burger Eisenbahn-Gesellschaft
 Werra-Eisenbahn-Gesellschaft
 Wesselburen-Heider Eisenbahn-Gesellschaft
 Westdeutsche Eisenbahn-Gesellschaft
 Westholsteinische Eisenbahn-Gesellschaft
 Wiesentalbahn (Basel - Zell)
 Wittenberge-Perleberger Eisenbahn of the town of Perleberg
 Zittau-Oybin-Jonsdorfer Eisenbahn-Gesellschaft
 Zittau-Reichenberger Eisenbahn

Light railways (Kleinbahnen) 

(Eigenbetriebe und Privatrechtliche Gesellschaften)
(Zahlreiche Kleinbahnen firmierten seit den vierziger Jahren des vorigen Jahrhunderts als Eisenbahnen)

A–C 

 Allgemeine Lokal- und Straßenbahn-Gesellschaft
 Allgemeine Lokalbahn- und Kraftwerke AG (Alloka)
 Alsener Kreisbahnen E: Kreis Sonderburg
 Altlandsberger Kleinbahn AG
 Altmärkische Kleinbahn AG
 Apenrader Kreisbahn
 Aschersleben-Schneidlingen-Nienhagener Eisenbahn AG
 AG Binger Nebenbahnen
 AG Demminer Kleinbahnen Ost
 AG Demminer Kleinbahnen West
 AG für Energiewirtschaft
 AG Franzburger Kreisbahnen
 AG Franzburger Südbahn
 AG Kleinbahn Casekow-Penkun-Oder
 AG Ruhr-Lippe-Eisenbahnen
 Bad Eilsener Kleinbahn GmbH
 Bad Orber Kleinbahn AG
 Bahnverband Vechta-Cloppenburg
 Bergedorf-Geesthachter Eisenbahn AG
 Bergheimer Kreisbahn
 Bielefelder Kreisbahnen
 Billwerder Industriebahn
 Bleckeder Kleinbahn GmbH
 Bleckeder Kreisbahn
 Boizenburger Stadt- und Hafenbahn
 Bremervörde-Osterholzer Eisenbahn GmbH
 Bremisch-Hannoversche Kleinbahn AG
 Kleinbahn Bremen-Tarmstedt
 Kleinbahn Bremen-Thedinghausen
 Breslau–Trebnitz–Prausnitzer Kleinbahn AG
 Buckower Kleinbahn AG
 Bunzlauer Kleinbahn AG
 Burgdorfer Kreisbahnen
 Butjadinger Bahn E: Kreis Wesermarsch
 Buxtehude-Harsefelder Eisenbahn GmbH

D–F 

 Delitzscher Kleinbahn AG
 Dürener Eisenbahn AG
 Eckernförder Kreisbahnen (Eckernförde–Owschlag)
 Eisenbahn-Zweckverband Rastenberg-Hardisleben
 Ernstbahn GmbH
 Eulengebirgsbahn AG
 Euskirchener Kreisbahnen
 Fischhausener Kreisbahn AG
 Flensburger Kreisbahn
 Forster Stadteisenbahn
 Frankensteiner Kreisbahn AG
 Frankfurter Lokalbahn AG
 Friedeberger Kleinbahn Eigenbetrieb des Kreises Friedeberg (Neumark)

G–J 

 Gardelegen-Haldensleben-Weferlinger Eisenbahn AG
 Geilenkirchener Kreisbahnen Eigenbetrieb Kreis Geilenkirchen-Heinsberg
 Geldernsche Kreisbahn
 Gelnhäuser Kreisbahnen
 Bad Orber Kleinbahn
 Freigerichter Kleinbahn
 Spessartbahn
 Vogelsberger Südbahn
 Görlitzer Kreisbahn AG
 Göttinger Kleinbahn AG (Gartetalbahn)
 Goldbeck-Werben-Elbe Kleinbahn GmbH
 Grifte-Gudensberger Kleinbahn und Kraftwagen AG
 Guhrauer Kreisbahn AG
 Gummersbacher Kleinbahnen Stadt GM und Oberbergischer Kreis
 Haderslebener Kreisbahn
 Haffuferbahn AG
 Halle-Hettstedter Eisenbahn-Gesellschaft
 Hamburger Marschbahn E: Hansestadt Hamburg
 Hanauer Kleinbahn
 Heerwegen–Raudtener Kleinbahn AG
 Herforder Kleinbahn GmbH
 Herkulesbahn
 Hersfelder Kreisbahn
 Hohenlimburger Kleinbahn
 Hümmlinger Kreisbahn
 Industriebahn AG
 Kleinbahn Beuel–Großenbusch
 Kleinbahn Kaldenkirchen–Brüggen
 Insterburger Kleinbahnen
 Isergebirgsbahn AG
 Iserlohner Kreisbahn AG
 Jülicher Kreisbahn

K 

 Kleinbahn-AG Bebitz-Alsleben
 Kleinbahn-AG Ellrich-Zorge
 Kleinbahn-AG Erfurt-Nottleben
 Kleinbahn AG Freest–Bergensin
 Kleinbahn-AG Gardelegen-Haldensleben-Weferlingen
 Kleinbahn-AG in Genthin
 Kleinbahn-AG Gransee-Neuglobsow
 Kleinbahn-AG Grünberg–Sprottau
 Kleinbahn AG Guttentag–Vosswalde
 Kleinbahn-AG Heudeber-Mattierzoll
 Kleinbahn AG Jauer–Maltsch
 Kleinbahn-AG Kiel-Segeberg
 Kleinbahn-AG Könnern-Rothenburg
 Kleinbahn AG Kohlfurt–Rothwasser
 Kleinbahn-AG Lüben–Kotzenau
 Kleinbahn-AG Marienwerder
 Kleinbahn-AG Neuburxdorf-Mühlberg (siehe Bahnstrecke Neuburxdorf–Mühlberg)
 Kleinbahn-AG Osterburg-Pretzier
 Kleinbahn-AG Rennsteig-Frauenwald
 Kleinbahn-AG Mockrehna–Schildau (siehe Bahnstrecke Mockrehna–Schildau)
 Kleinbahn-AG Schönberg-Nikolausdorf
 Kleinbahn-AG Selters-Hachenburg
 Kleinbahn-AG Tangermünde–Lüderitz
 Kleinbahn-AG Tharau-Kreuzburg
 Kleinbahn-AG Tirschtiegel-Dürrlettel
 Kleinbahn-AG Wallwitz-Wettin
 Kleinbahn-AG Wolmirstedt-Colbitz
 Kleinbahn Bad Zwischenahn–Edewechterdamm
 Kleinbahn Bergwitz-Kemberg GmbH (siehe Bahnstrecke Bergwitz-Kemberg)
 Kleinbahn Bielstein-Waldbröl E:Kreiskommunalverband GM
 Kleinbahn Bossel-Blankenstein GmbH
 Kleinbahn Bremervörde-Osterholz GmbH
 Kleinbahn Buxtehude-Harsefeld GmbH
 Kleinbahn Celle-Soltau, Celle-Munster GmbH
 Kleinbahn Celle-Wittingen AG
 Kleinbahn Deutsch Krone-Virchow
 Kleinbahn Eckernförde-Owschlag
 Kleinbahn Eltville-Schlangenbad
 Kleinbahn Engelskirchen-Marienheide E: Oberbergischer Kreis
 Kleinbahn Ensdorf-Saarlouis-Wallerfangen-Felsberg E: Kreis Saarlouis
 Kleinbahn Farge-Wulsdorf GmbH
 Kleinbahn Freienwalde-Zehden AG
 Kleinbahn Friedeberg-Alt Libbehne GmbH
 Kleinbahn Garßen-Bergen
 Kleinbahn Gittelde-Grund GmbH
 Kleinbahn Gommern-Pretzien
 Kleinbahn Groß Ilsede-Broistedt
 Kleinbahn Groß Peterwitz-Katscher
 Kleinbahn Groß Raum-Ellerkrug GmbH
 Kleinbahn Haspe-Voerde-Breckerfeld
 Kleinbahn Horka (Wehrkirch)-Rothenburg-Priebus AG
 Kleinbahn Hoya-Syke-Asendorf GmbH
 Kleinbahn Ihrhove-Westrhauderfehn GmbH
 Kleinbahn Kirchbarkau-Preetz-Lütjenburg
 Kleinbahn Klockow-Pasewalk GmbH
 Kleinbahn Kreuz-Schloppe-Deutsch Krone E: Kreis Deutsch Krone
 Kleinbahn Küstrin-Hammer AG
 Kleinbahn Langenfeld-Monheim-Hitdorf E: Gemeinden
 Kleinbahn Lingen-Berge-Quakenbrück GmbH
 Kleinbahn Lohne-Dinklage
 Kleinbahn Lüchow-Schmarsau GmbH
 Kleinbahn Lüneburg-Soltau GmbH
 Kleinbahn Lütjenbrode-Orth (Fehmarn) der Kreis Oldenburger Eisenbahn AG
 Kleinbahn Merzig-Büschfeld GmbH
 Kleinbahn Neuhaus-Brahlstorf GmbH
 Kleinbahn Neuwied-Rasselstein-Augustenthal
 Kleinbahn Niebüll-Dagebüll AG
 Kleinbahn Opladen-Lützenkirchen E: Rhein-Wupper-Kreis
 Kleinbahn Pforzheim−Ittersbach
 Kleinbahn Piesberg-Rheine AG
 Kleinbahn Pogegen-Schmalleningken
 Kleinbahn Rees-Empel E: Stadt Rees
 Kleinbahn Rheinbrohl-Mahlberg
 Kleinbahn Siegburg-Zündorf E: Siegkreis
 Kleinbahn Soltau-Neuenkirchen GmbH
 Kleinbahn Steinhelle-Medebach GmbH
 Kleinbahn Wallersdorf–Münchshöfen
 Kleinbahn Weidenau-Deuz
 Kleinbahn Wegenstedt–Calvörde E: Gemeinde Calvörde
 Kleinbahn Wesel-Rees-Emmerich E: Kreis Rees
 Kleinbahn Winsen-Evendorf-Hützel GmbH
 Kleinbahn Winsen-Niedermarschacht GmbH
 Kleinbahn Wittingen-Oebisfelde GmbH
 Kleinbahnen des Kreises Jerichow I
 Kleinbahnen der Kreise Ost- und Westprignitz
 Kleinbahn Kyritz-Hoppenrade-Breddin
 Kleinbahn Lindenberg-Pritzwalk
 Kleinbahn Lindenberg-Kreuzweg
 Kleinbahn Pritzwalk-Putlitz
 Kleinbahn Putlitz-Suckow
 Kleinbahn Perleberg-Karstädt-Berge-Perleberg
 Kleinbahn Perleberg-Hoppenrade
 Kleinbahn Viesecke-Glöwen
 Kleinbahnabteilung des Provinzialverbandes Sachsen in Merseburg
 Altmärkische Kleinbahn AG
 Delitzscher Kleinbahn AG
 Kleinbahn-AG Bebitz-Alsleben
 Kleinbahn Bergwitz-Kemberg GmbH (siehe Bahnstrecke Bergwitz-Kemberg)
 Kleinbahn-AG Ellrich-Zorge
 Kleinbahn-AG Erfurt-Nottleben
 Kleinbahn-AG Gardelegen-Haldensleben-Weferlingen
 Kleinbahn-AG in Genthin
 Kleinbahn-AG Heudeber-Mattierzoll
 Kleinbahn-AG Könnern-Rothenburg
 Kleinbahn-AG Neuburxdorf–Mühlberg (siehe Bahnstrecke Neuburxdorf–Mühlberg)
 Kleinbahn-AG Osterburg-Pretzier
 Kleinbahn-AG Rennsteig-Frauenwald
 Kleinbahn-AG Mockrehna–Schildau (siehe Bahnstrecke Mockrehna–Schildau)
 Kleinbahn-AG Wallwitz-Wettin
 Kleinbahn-AG Wolmirstedt-Colbitz
 Kyffhäuser Kleinbahn AG
 Langensalzaer Kleinbahn AG
 Obereichsfelder Kleinbahn AG
 Prettin-Annaburger Kleinbahn AG
 Salzwedeler Kleinbahnen GmbH
 Stendaler Kleinbahn AG
 Kleinbahngesellschaft Anklam-Lassan
 Kleinbahngesellschaft Greifswald-Jarmen
 Kleinbahngesellschaft Greifswald-Wolgast
 Kleinbahngesellschaft Güdenhagen-Groß Möllen GmbH
 Königs Wusterhausen-Mittenwalde-Töpchiner Kleinbahn AG
 Kohlenbahn-AG Reichenau (Sachsen)
 Kreisbahn Beeskow–Fürstenwalde E: Kreis Beeskow-Storkow
 Kreisbahn Cloppenburg-Landesgrenze
 Kreisbahn Emden-Pewsum-Greetsiel E: Kreis Norden
 Kreisbahn Leer-Aurich-Wittmund
 Kreisbahn Norderdithmarschen in Heide
 Kreisbahn Osterode–Kreiensen E: Kreis Osterode (Harz) (siehe Bahnstrecke Osterode–Kreiensen)
 Kreisbahn Rathenow-Senzke-Nauen E: Kreis Westhavelland
 Kreisbahn Schönermark-Damme E: Kreise Angermünde und Prenzlau
 Kreisverkehrsbetriebe Saarlouis AG
 Kreiswerke Geilenkirchen-Heinsberg
 Kreuznacher Kleinbahnen (VKA)
 Kyffhäuser Kleinbahn AG

L–N 

 Landesverkehrsamt Brandenburg (LVA)
 Altlandsberger Kleinbahn AG
 Buckower Kleinbahn AG
 Friedeberger Kleinbahn
 Jüterbog-Luckenwalder Kreiskleinbahnen (bis 15. Februar 1939) (Schmalspur)
 Kleinbahn Freienwalde-Zehden AG
 Kleinbahn Friedeberg-Alt Libbehne GmbH
 Kleinbahn Küstrin-Hammer AG
 Kreisbahn Beeskow–Fürstenwalde
 Lehniner Kleinbahn AG
 Müncheberger Kleinbahn
 Oderbruchbahn AG
 Ostprignitzer Kreiskleinbahnen
 Kleinbahn Kyritz-Hoppenrade-Breddin (Schmalspur)
 Kleinbahn Lindenberg-Kreuzweg (Schmalspur)
 Kleinbahn Lindenberg-Pritzwalk (Schmalspur)
 Kleinbahn Pritzwalk-Putlitz
 Kleinbahn Putlitz-Suckow
 Spreewaldbahn AG (Schmalspur)
 Westprignitzer Kreiskleinbahnen
 Kleinbahn Perleberg-Hoppenrade (Schmalspur)
 Kleinbahn Perleberg-Karstädt-Berge-Perleberg
 Kleinbahn Viesecke-Glöwen (Schmalspur)
 Weststernberger Kreiskleinbahn
 Langensalzaer Kleinbahn AG
 Lehniner Kleinbahn AG
 Lübben-Cottbuser Kreisbahnen
 Lübeck-Segeberger Eisenbahn
 Marburger Kreisbahn
 Marienborn-Beendorfer Kleinbahn-Gesellschaft (AG)
 Mecklenburg-Pommersche Schmalspurbahn AG
 Mecklenburgische Bäderbahn (Rövershagen-Graal=Müritz)
 Memeler Kleinbahn AG
 Merzig-Büschfelder Eisenbahn
 Moselbahn AG
 Müncheberger Kleinbahn E: Stadt Müncheberg
 Nassauische Kleinbahn AG
 Neisser Kreisbahn AG
 Neumarkter Kleinbahn AG
 Niedersächsisches Landeseisenbahnamt (NLEA)
 Niederweserbahn GmbH

O–R 

 Oberbergische Verkehrsgesellschaft AG
 Obereichsfelder Kleinbahn AG
 Oberweißbacher Bergbahn AG
 Oderbruchbahn AG
 Ohlauer Kleinbahn AG
 Ostpreußische Kleinbahnen AG übernahm folgende Bahnen:
 Insterburger Kleinbahnen AG mit
 Elchniederungsbahn
 Kleinbahn Heydekrug–Kolleschen
 Klb. Tilsit–Pogegen–Schmalleningken
 Königsberger Kleinbahn AG
 Lycker Kleinbahnen AG
 Oletzkoer Kleinbahnen-AG
 Ortelsburger Kleinbahn AG
 Pillkaller Kleinbahn-AG
 Rastenburger Kleinbahn GmbH
 Wehlau–Friedländer Kreisbahn-AG
 Wöterkeim–Schippenbeiler Kleinbahn-AG
 Plettenberger Kleinbahn AG
 Polkwitz–Raudtener Kleinbahn AG
 Pommersche Landesbahnen
 Anklamer Bahn
 Casekow-Penkuner Bahn
 Bahnen des Kreises Deutsch Krone
 Demminer Bahnen
 Franzburger Bahnen (Nord)
 Franzburger Bahnen (Süd)
 Greifenberger Bahnen
 Greifenhagener Bahnen
 Greifswalder Bahnen
 Köslin-Belgarder Bahnen
 Kolberger Bahnen
 Lauenburger Bahnen
 Naugarder Bahnen
 Pyritzer Bahnen
 Randower Bahn
 Regenwalder Bahnen
 Rügensche Bahnen
 Saatziger Bahnen
 Schlawer Bahnen
 Stolper Bahnen
 Prenzlauer Kreisbahnen
 Prettin-Annaburger Kleinbahn AG
 Ratzeburger Kleinbahn AG
 Reichensteiner Bahn
 Riesengebirgsbahn GmbH
 Rendsburger Kreisbahn
 Rheinisch-Westfälische Straßen- und Kleinbahnen GmbH
 Kleinbahn Langenfeld-Monheim-Hitdorf
 Kleinbahn Opladen-Lützenkirchen
 Kleinbahn Rees-Empel
 Kleinbahn Siegburg-Zündorf
 Kleinbahn Wesel-Rees-Emmerich
 Klever Straßenbahn
 Straßenbahn Opladen-Ohligs
 Wahner Straßenbahn
 Rosenberger Kreisbahn AG
 Rügensche Kleinbahn

S–T 

 Saatziger Kleinbahnen AG
 Salzwedeler Kleinbahnen GmbH
 Samlandbahn AG
 St. Andreasberger Kleinbahn GmbH
 Schleizer Kleinbahn AG
 Schmalkalder Kreisbahn
 Söhrebahn AG
 Spreewaldbahn A.G.
 Spremberger Stadtbahn
 Steinhuder Meer-Bahn GmbH
 Stendaler Kleinbahn AG
 Strandbahn Warnemünde-Markgrafenheide E: Stadt Rostock
 Strausberg-Herzfelder Kleinbahn AG
 Südstormarnsche Kreisbahn
 Sylter Inselbahn AG
 Sylter Südbahn E: Hamburg-Amerika-Linie
 Teltower Eisenbahn AG
 Trachenberg–Militscher Kreisbahn AG
 Trusebahn AG

U–Z 

 Uetersener Eisenbahn AG
 Vereinigte Kleinbahnen AG
 Kleinbahn Neheim-Hüsten-Sundern
 Kleinbahn Philippsheim-Binsfeld
 Dessau-Radegast-Köthener Bahn
 Verkehrsbetriebe des Kreises Schleswig
 Vorortbahn Wilhelmshaven
 Westfälische Kleinbahnen AG
 Kleinbahn Westig-Ihmert-Altena-Dahle
 Westfälische Provinzialverwaltung – Kleinbahnabteilung
 Kleinbahn Steinhelle-Medebach GmbH
 Kleinbahn Unna-Kamen-Werne GmbH
 Kleinbahn Weidenau-Deuz GmbH
 Tecklenburger Nordbahn AG
 Westhavelländische Kreisbahnen
 Westpreußische Kleinbahnen AG
 Wittlager Kreisbahn AG
 Wüstewaltersdorfer Kleinbahn AG
 Ziederthal-Eisenbahn-Gesellschaft AG
 Zschornewitzer Kleinbahn GmbH

Railways outside Reich or Federal territory 

 Eisenbahngesellschaft für Deutsch-Ostafrika
 Otavi Minen- und Eisenbahn-Gesellschaft (OMEG, in the colony of German Southwest Africa)

!
Railway, Germany
German defunct
Defunct companies
Railway, defunct